Gabungan Sepakbola Takalar or Gasta is an  Indonesian football club based in Takalar Regency, South Sulawesi. Club played in Liga 3.

Players

References

Football clubs in Indonesia
Football clubs in South Sulawesi
Association football clubs established in 1980
1980 establishments in Indonesia